Austin Cheek Denney Jr. (January 2, 1944 – January 20, 2009) was an American football tight end in the National Football League for the Chicago Bears and Buffalo Bills. He played college football at the University of Tennessee.

Early years
Denney attended Donelson High School, where he lettered in football, basketball and baseball. He accepted a football scholarship from the University of Tennessee.

As a junior, he was moved from fullback to tight end, becoming a starter, while posting 14 receptions for 206 yards and 2 touchdowns. As a senior, he posted 21 receptions for 264 yards and 7 receiving touchdowns (school record for tight ends). He finished his college career with 35 receptions for 470 yards and 9 touchdowns (school record for tight ends).

Professional career

Dallas Cowboys
Denney was selected by the Dallas Cowboys in the eleventh round (160th overall) of the 1966 NFL Draft with a future draft pick, which allowed the team to draft him before his college eligibility was over. He also was selected in the redshirt round 2 (14th overall) of the 1966 AFL Draft. On September 6, 1967, he was traded along with Mac Percival to the Chicago Bears in exchange for a third round draft choice (#71-Ed Harmon).

Chicago Bears
In 1967, Denney became a starter at tight end for the Chicago Bears. His best season was 1968, when he registered 23 receptions for 247 yards and 2 touchdowns. He was released on September 1, 1970.

Buffalo Bills
On September 2, 1970, he was claimed off waivers by the Buffalo Bills. He was named the starter at tight end, making 14 receptions for 201 yards. He was released on September 15, 1971.

Personal life
On January 20, 2009, he died from an undisclosed illness.

References

1944 births
2009 deaths
Players of American football from Nashville, Tennessee
American football tight ends
Tennessee Volunteers football players
Chicago Bears players
Buffalo Bills players
American United Methodists
20th-century Methodists